On Point Motorsports is an American professional stock car racing team that fields the No. 30 Toyota Tundra part-time in the NASCAR Craftsman Truck Series for Ryan Vargas and Chris Hacker.

History
On July 11, 2018, former JGL Racing crew chief Steven Lane and a group of investors formed the team. The team announced that they would attempt to make their debut on August 16 at Bristol.

Xfinity Series
With the formation of their team on July 11, 2018, they announced plans to compete in the NASCAR Xfinity Series “soon”, although these plans never came to fruition and the team has not attempted to run in the Xfinity Series since then and in addition to that their stock of NXS chassis were sold off to MBM Motorsports in 2019.

Truck Series
In July 2018, Steven Lane and a group of investors along with James Whitener, Sr. who followed Lane from JGL Racing, formed the team and its No. 30 truck.

Truck No. 30 history

2018
The team made its Truck Series debut at Bristol with Scott Lagasse Jr. driving. Lagasse qualified for the race on time qualifying 22nd and finishing 31st after crashing early in the race. The team announced that Austin Theriault would drive the Las Vegas fall race. Theriault started the race 21st and finished 8th after avoiding multiple wrecks near the end of the race. For the Talladega race, the team announced that Lagasse was back on the team. Lagasse finished 18th. On October 22, 2018, the team announced that Jeb Burton would drive the truck at Martinsville, with Strutmasters.com being the sponsor, He finished 15th. The team and Burton returned for the season finale at Homestead where they qualified 21st and finished 18th.

2019
On January 28, 2019, the team announced Brennan Poole would drive for the team full-time. At Daytona they qualified 26th and finished 24th after being involved in The Big One while running 9th. For Atlanta and Las Vegas they received sponsorship from conservative website keepandbear.com stirring up a bit of controversy, however, they still finished 13th and 20th respectively. At Martinsville the team would receive sponsorship from Bad Boy Mowers once again where they qualified 28th and finish 29th after a plug wire failure in numerous Ilmor Engines that day. For Texas they went unsponsored till raceday when Bad Boy Mowers again stepped in, they qualified 13th and finished 9th. At Dover they qualified 8th but were forced into the wall on lap 1 and ended up finishing the race in 23rd, 10 laps down. On May 8, 2019, On Point Motorsports announced they would withdraw from Kansas after financial issues, but they would enter at Charlotte.

On May 17, 2019, they returned at Charlotte, where they had a strong truck all day leading final practice and would qualify 17th, however, the team recorded their best finish ever with a second-place finish with Poole coming up one spot short to Kyle Busch.

At Texas, Poole scored another top ten finish while also scoring stage points in Stage 2 with a 7th-place finish and 6th place Stage 2 finish after starting 18th. They followed it up at Iowa with an 11th-place finish after qualifying 15th. At Gateway they entered but later withdrew, then did not enter at all the next week at Chicagoland. They returned at Kentucky where they qualified 10th and despite running top 5 all night, finishing 15th two laps down after Ben Rhodes came up the racetrack and wrecked himself and Poole. That wreck was later met with Rhodes attempting to fight Poole but he was pulled away before he could ever get to Poole. They returned at Bristol with Brennan Poole with backing from Bad Boy Mowers and Inspectra Thermal Solutions where they qualified 9th and finish 19th after getting wrecked by Natalie Decker and Gus Dean while running 12th with inside 10 to go. On September 12, 2019, Poole and On Point announced they would return at Las Vegas with sponsorship from Goettl Air Conditioning, they qualified 18th and finished 6th after a solid run all night. The team returned to the site of what was nearly Poole's first career NASCAR Xfinity Series win at Talladega Superspeedway, the team ran around 11th all day but blew a tire while running 4th with 21 to go and finish 26th.

On August 7, 2019, On Point announced that Danny Bohn would make his Truck Series debut at Martinsville. Despite running right around 20th all day the team made perfect on a strategy call to stay out on fuel and avoided multiple wrecks to finish a strong eighth, at ISM, the team struggled all race and finished 27th, six laps down after a mid-race spin.

2020
Poole and Bohn returned to the No. 30 in 2020, with Poole running the first half of the season and Bohn running the second half of the season. Scott Lagasse Jr. also ran one race in the No. 30 at the Daytona Road Course. The team entered all races except for Dover in August.

2021
On January 28, 2021, OPM announced that Bohn would be back with them in 2021 in the No. 30. The team retained his 2020 sponsor, North American Motor Car, for at least the season-opener at Daytona. The team stated that a full season was possible if additional sponsorship could be found. Bohn proceeded to run the entire season with only excluding COTA, which was run by Trans-Am female Michele Abbate, and Texas, which was run by Brennan Poole.

2022
On November 30, 2021, it was announced that Tate Fogleman would race full-time in the No. 30 Toyota Tundra full-time.

Truck No. 30 results

 Season still in progress

ARCA Menards Series
In November 2018 On Point announced they would expand to the ARCA Racing Series for the 2019 season on a part-time basis.

Car No. 29 history
On January 4, 2019, On Point announced they would test a car with Derrick Lancaster, they would end up 7th in the test leading them to put him in the car for the ARCA season opener at Daytona, he would qualify 26th and finish 17th.

Car No. 29 results

 Season still in progress

References

External links
 
 

American auto racing teams
NASCAR teams